Song Byeong-hwa (born August 11, 1994), known professionally as Song I-han, is a South Korean singer-songwriter. He competed in the blind audition program Blind Musician in 2018 and won the competition, immediately releasing his debut single "Reason". At the end of 2020, he released a special single entitled "I Will Be Your Shining Star" amidst the global COVID-19 pandemic. The ballad rose in prominence and was nicknamed "wedding song icon" upon the launch of a contest in which three soon-to-be-married couples would be selected for a free performance by Song at their wedding. Song received two award nominations at the 36th Golden Disc Awards.

Early life
Song I-han was born Song Byeong-hwa in Bucheon, South Korea, on August 11, 1994. In his youth, he focused on becoming an architect. He visited a noraebang to sing with his friends for the first time in high school, whom expressed surprise at his vocal abilities. Song began to study music in his first year to become a vocal trainer. He registered at an applied music hagwon's hobby class before taking the entrance exam for the professional department, which he failed. Song began his mandatory military service at age 20 and further developed his singing skills. Upon completing his duty, he worked various part-time jobs to invest in his music career. His father was ill between one to two years before dying in 2017.

Career
In January 2018, entertainment company Music Design opened applications to the public for its blind audition talent competition Blind Musician. Song was tagged by his friend in the company's Facebook post about the contest, which he decided to enter. Participants entered as the name of their place of residence and were evaluated by a judge panel from the contender's voice only; Song used the name Hwigyeong-dong. From a pool 13,000 applicants, Song advanced to the final four and their final entries were uploaded on social networking services; he performed a cover of MC the Max's "Wind That Blows". A showcase was held at COEX Convention & Exhibition Center on June 3 where Song was revealed as the winner; he released his debut single "Reason" on the same day. Feeling that his birth name was old-fashioned, he adopted the moniker Song I-han for a more "refined and stylish" name. On March 25, 2019, his followup single "Means Goodbye" was released, where he contributed to the song's lyrics and composition. He also provided the track "You Don't Know" to the soundtrack of the web drama The Witch Store (2019). By the end of the year, Song signed an exclusive contract with Music Design.

Song issued his first mini-album Fade Away and its lead single "U Everyday" on March 25, 2020. In addition to penning all songs on the album, he was also involved in producing the record. He supplied the song "It's Not Okay" for the television series Brilliant Heritage two months later. On December 29, he released a special R&B single entitled "I Will Be Your Shining Star". In contrast to his previous breakup records, the track was a love song. He launched an event alongside its release in which three couples to wed amidst the ongoing COVID-19 pandemic would be selected to win a free congratulatory performance by Song. It resulted in the single's gradual rise on music charts and was dubbed a "wedding song icon". "I Will Be Your Shining Star" ultimately peaked at number nine of South Korea's weekly national Circle Digital Chart. On Circle Chart's year-end report for 2021, the single ranked at number 18 on its list of best-performing singles.

On December 12, 2021, Song released his second mini-album My Empty Space and its lead single "Memory of You". Song recorded a rendition of Ali's debut single "365 Days" from her 2009 debut EP After the Love Has Gone, which he released in February 7, 2022. On June 12, Song released the single "My Eyes on You". He contended in the singing competition program King of Mask Singer wearing a mask of street toast to conceal his identity. He competed against a female vocalist donning a twisted doughnut mask and lost 59–40.

Musical style
Song identifies his "sweet" voice and high notes as his strengths. Writing for entertainment website Xportsnews, Kim Ye-na took note of his ability to bring listeners to tears through the sentiments expressed in his breakup ballads. His singing style has been compared to Yang Da-il, whose vocals he identified as an influence of his singing technique. Song cites Naul of Brown Eyed Seoul and Jung Key as his role models for singing and songwriting, respectively. He expressed his interest in learning the "emotions and depth" of Naul's singing. In terms of songwriting, Song incorporates the memories of his emotions into the lyrics, as opposed to what he feels at the time.

Philanthropy
On New Year's Day in 2020, Song and ten of his fans visited the foster care facility Sunduk Home in Seoul, where they provided snacks, played with the children, and cleaned the premises.

Discography

Albums

Extended plays

Singles

As lead artist

Guest appearances

Soundtrack appearances

Filmography

Awards and nominations

|-
! scope="row" rowspan="2"|2022
| rowspan="2"|Golden Disc Awards
| Digital Song Bonsang
| "I Will Be Your Shining Star"
| 
|
|-
| Seezn Most Popular Artist Award
| Song I-han
| 
|

Notes

References

1994 births
21st-century South Korean singers
Living people
People from Bucheon
Singing talent show winners
South Korean contemporary R&B singers
South Korean male singer-songwriters